A memory box is a box containing objects that serve as reminders.

Dementia

In cases of dementia, a memory box may be used as a form of therapy to remind the patient of their earlier life.

Deceased infants

Memory boxes are provided by some hospitals in the event of stillbirth, miscarriage, or other problem during or after childbirth. They contain objects belonging to or representing the deceased child to help relatives come to terms with their loss. Memory boxes are usually donated by local charities and organizations.

Memory boxes for miscarriage, stillbirth and infant loss can contain the following items:
lock of hair
baby blanket
special box to keep items in
data card that states baby's name and birth information
card/ink pad for taking foot/hand prints
journal
writing pen
small stuffed animal to use in photos
outfit that fits the baby
air-dry clay for taking foot/hand molds
disposable camera
pocket kleenex
bereavement books and information

References

Equipment used in childbirth
Miscarriage
Stillbirth